Encelia is a genus of the plant family Asteraceae. It consists of shrubs (and one geophyte) of arid environments in southwestern North America and western South America.

All have n = 18 chromosomes. All the North American species are obligate outcrossers. In cultivation, the species readily form fertile F1 hybrids, F2s, and backcrosses, but in natural areas of sympatry, F2s and backcrosses are absent or rare.

Encelia species are used as food plants by the larvae of some Lepidoptera species including the leaf miner Bucculatrix enceliae which feeds exclusively on Encelia farinosa.

The phylogenetic sister group of Encelia is a clade comprising the genera Enceliopsis and Geraea. The three genera are informally called the "Encelia alliance".

Encelia is named in honor of German biologist Christophorus Enzelius, 1517–1583.

Species
Encelia actoni Elmer - California
Encelia asperifolia (S.F.Blake) C. Clark & Kyhos - Baja California
Encelia californica Nutt. - Baja California, Baja California Sur, California
Encelia canescens Lam. - Peru, northern Chile, Bolivia
Encelia conspersa Benth. - Baja California Sur
Encelia densifolia C.Clark & Kyhos - Baja California Sur
Encelia farinosa Torr. & A.Gray var. farinosa - brittlebush - Baja California, Baja California Sur, California, Sonora, Sinaloa, Hidalgo, Arizona, Utah, Nevada
Encelia frutescens (A.Gray) A.Gray - Arizona, California, Nevada, Baja California
Encelia halimifolia Cav. - Baja California, Baja California Sur, Sonora
Encelia hispida Andersson - Galápagos
Encelia laciniata Vasey & Rose -  Baja California, Baja California Sur
Encelia nutans Eastwood -  Utah, Colorado
Encelia palmeri Vasey & Rose - Baja California Sur
Encelia pilocarpa Rubsy- Bolivia
Encelia pilosiflora S.F.Blake - Peru
Encelia ravenii Wiggins - Baja California Sur
Encelia resinifera C. Clark -  Utah, Arizona
Encelia scaposa (A.Gray) A.Gray- Chihuahua, Texas, New Mexico
Encelia stenophylla Greene - Baja California, Baja California Sur
Encelia ventorum T.S Brandegee - Baja California, Baja California Sur
Encelia virginensis A. Nels. - California, Arizona,  Utah, Nevada, New Mexico

References

Further reading 
 

 
Asteraceae genera
Flora of California